Automobile Club of Buffalo is a historic clubhouse located at Clarence in Erie County, New York.  It was designed by the architectural firm of Esenwein & Johnson and built in 1910–1911 in the Craftsman style.  It is a two-story, "Y"-shaped, wood-frame building with a low hipped roof and broad eaves. The building measures 184 feet long and 32 feet wide. It features a deep porte cochere, semicircular two-story tower, broad verandah, enclosed one-story porch, and two exposed chimneys.  Also on the property is a contributing storage shed. The property was sold to the Town of Clarence in 1957, and is used as a town park.  The Automobile Club of Buffalo joined the American Automobile Association in 1903, one of its earliest affiliates.  The clubhouse was built to promote membership in the Automobile Club of Buffalo, and was one of only six country clubs built by similar organizations in the United States.

It was added to the National Register of Historic Places in 2012.

References

Buffalo
Clubhouses on the National Register of Historic Places in New York (state)
Buildings and structures completed in 1911
Buildings and structures in Erie County, New York
National Register of Historic Places in Buffalo, New York
Road transportation on the National Register of Historic Places
Motor vehicle buildings and structures on the National Register of Historic Places
Transportation buildings and structures on the National Register of Historic Places in New York (state)